Fan economy in the traditional sense refers to operational income generating behavior relationship between fans and the people who are followed. Most of them are stars, network celebrities and industry celebrities, even an enterprise. Fan economy is a kind of operation mode to obtain the economic and social benefits through promoting the users’ loyalty to optimize the effect of word of mouth marketing. The core is the emotional capital. Different from the traditional economy, consumers are leading role in fan economy. It is dominated by consumers to achieve the purposes of adding value idols and the brand.

Background
According to the research of American scholar Janet Staiger, fans in the broad sense can be traced back to Victorian times. Chinese fans began to appear in the late 1980s and early 1990s. They were called "style-conscious fans" at that time, unlike today's popular name "fans". In the contradictory process of being identified and preventing the cultural homogeneity of mainstream culture simultaneously , fans have formed their own unique style within their own circles. The fan culture is attracting more and more experts and scholars to study in the course of being suspected to be accepted.

Scholar Yang Ling defined the triple degree for the "fan economy" : the emotional economy, the gift economy and the informal economy. She thinks the ultimate significance of "fans economy" in the field of culture is to break the centralized power structure, thus to give more power to consumers, to promote the diversity of cultural . She drew the theory of western fans research and made her reflections on the power relations between producers and consumers implied by the emotional economy. Yang ling believes that the ideas of fan economy that are popular domestic currently are relatively narrow. They defined fan economy as a kind of brand marketing narrowly in the new media era. They only treated fans who were increasing rapidly as the loyal customers and followers and ignored the autonomy of fan community autonomy. So it is necessary for us to pay more attention to the moral and legal issues, which are not involved in the interests in the economic system in the discussion of fan economy in the future. And to explore whether "fan economy" brought a more fair distribution of rights and interests. And whether the beneficiaries of fan economy are the fan community and fan culture or not.

Scholars Li Wenming and Lv Fuyu believes the following aspects should be focused in terms of the development trend of fan economy: meeting the demand of fans and guiding the fans demand; managing to fans circle and fans community. The main strategies that comply with the development trend of fan economic can be divided into several aspects broadly: laying the solid foundation on fan economy; building distinctive fans brand; creating a new situation in electronic commerce of fans economy; maximizing the advantages of fan economy in community business. The essence of the fan economy is the brand community, which is a typical community thought.

The Cause of Fan Economy

A mature economic form must have the steps of attracting users, keeping users and making the profits. As for traditional cultural products, the step of attracting and keeping users are based on product positioning and product quality. With the further refinement of the division of labor, the way of promoting cultural products has changed dramatically. Different from the form of product quality promotion in the past, the product quality and promotion are now pursued in different quality requirements in recent years.

Fan economy was a new generation of operation and promotion. There were the concept of fan group at first, and then utilized the concept on promotion with the operation of modern cultural industry system. Fan economy was born. In fan economy, the core of fan group is not the fans promotion, but the production of promotional products. The quality of promotional products is not high enough to be best, but to meet the requirements of the rapid spread of production. It requires to let the user generate images in5 minutes and begin to spread.

The Development Process of Fan Economy

In the early 1990s, there was already a fan economy. British scholar Matt Hills observed, in the media industry transformation, the loyal fans became the most attractive consumers. If the television station wants to make a profit, there is no need to pursue the largest number of ordinary public, only to cater to a certain number of the most loyal audiences.

After Chinese Economic Reform and open up, there has been real "fans" in China, such as Teresa Teng’s fans. But it is not commercial at that time, nor could it be called fan economy. In fact, the development speed of fan economy is consistent with the popularity of commercialization. The fans culture and fan economy has been developed in the late 1990s. The fans had stronger spontaneity, but lacked of planning and organization.

In recent years, fans tend to be professional and organized. Fans industry has formed gradually. And that is what has happened in recent years with the development of various talent shows, such as the program "super girl" made by Hunan TV station in the past few years. Now fans is a special group of popular culture recipients on age of 15 to 31 years old. Female is majority. They put extraordinary enthusiasm on what they admire of specific individuals (stars, celebrities), program/work (film, television show, music works), group (pop group, the football team). Although they may be not have a very strong purchasing power, but the impulse to consume for their idols are shocking.

The rise of social media is changing the communication method of mass media. In the new Internet context, the number of fans not only means that the influence also means economic value. What is the value of fans? Market research firm Syncapse said in a report recently, fans value of brands in Facebook has risen 30% since 2010. Currently, the average fans value of Facebook brands was worth $174; Yao Chen, a Chinese actress, is known as the "Weibo Queen". Her Weibo has been valued at $320 million by a valuation website. The growing fans group form the framework like Pyramid gradually. The upper level is occupied by leaders who master a lot of information about membership and idol. And the bottom is plenty of ordinary fans. Fan are special users. Their attention means the potential purchase behavior. As long as operating and managing well, the fan effect will be expanded gradually. The promotion force of a group of fans is even stronger than a professional team. They contain tremendous power to promote the industry.

References

Fandom
Economy by field